My Younger Brother is a 1962 Soviet drama film directed by Aleksandr Zarkhi.

Plot 
The film tells about four friends who, after passing the final exams, decided to go to the Baltic States to feel like adults, and even the attempt of the brother of one of them to dissuade them does not stop them.

Cast 
 Lyudmila Marchenko as Galya
 Aleksandr Zbruev as Dima Denisov
 Oleg Dahl as Alik
 Andrei Mironov as Yurka
 Oleg Efremov as Viktor Denisov
 Ivan Savkin
 Arvo Kruusement
 Jaan Saul as Endel (as Ya. Saul)
 Sergei Kurilov as Innokentiy Petrov (as S. Kurilov)
 Villu Tomingas as Gustav (as V. Tomingas)

References

External links 
 

1962 films
1960s Russian-language films
1960s teen drama films
1962 drama films
Soviet teen drama films